Artem Vasylenko (born 8 December 1989 in Kharkiv) is a Ukrainian judoka. He competed in the men's 81 kg event at the 2012 Summer Olympics and was eliminated in the first round by Islam Bozbayev.

References

External links
 
 
 

1989 births
Living people
National University of Kharkiv alumni
Sportspeople from Kharkiv
Ukrainian male judoka
Olympic judoka of Ukraine
Judoka at the 2012 Summer Olympics
21st-century Ukrainian people